The Lake Wales Commercial Historic District is a U.S. historic district (designated as such on May 10, 1990) located in Lake Wales, Florida. The district is bounded by the US 27A Scenic Highway, Central Avenue, Market Street, and Orange Avenue. It contains 16 historic buildings.

References

External links

 Polk County listings at National Register of Historic Places

Lake Wales, Florida
National Register of Historic Places in Polk County, Florida
Historic districts on the National Register of Historic Places in Florida